Brigadier (R) Manzoor Hussain Atif (4 September 1928 – 8 December 2008) was a former secretary of Pakistan Hockey Federation and an Olympian in the game of field hockey. In 1994, he was a recipient of the Silver Olympic Order.

Early life and career
Atif started as a soldier in the Pakistan Armed Forces and eventually reached the rank of a Brigadier before he retired from the army.
Later while Atif was involved with the Pakistan Hockey Team, the team won one Olympic gold medal in 1960 and two Olympic silver medals in 1956 and again in 1964. He is regarded as one of the most successful Olympians of Pakistan.
 Atif was the Secretary of Pakistan Hockey Federation for 11 years
 Atif was the Secretary of Asian Hockey Federation for 16 years
 Atif was the Vice President of Asian Hockey Federation from 1982 to 2001

Awards and recognition
 Pride of Performance Award for Sports in 1963 by the President of Pakistan
 Lifetime Achievement Award by the Asian Hockey Federation

Death and legacy
Atif died on 8 December 2008 in Combined Military Hospital Rawalpindi, Pakistan at age 80. He was a passionate person as a field hockey player as well as a Pakistan Hockey Team manager. Pakistan won its second Olympic gold medal at Mexico City in 1968 and then at Los Angeles in 1984 when he was their team manager. He was a highly respected person in the field hockey world. Qasim Zia and Asif Bajwa of the Pakistan Hockey Federation paid rich tributes to Atif at a memorial ceremony event held at Lahore, after his death. Qasim Zia said, "He was not only a pure administrator but also a very polite and humble person."

References

External links
 
 Pakistan Hockey Team

1928 births
2008 deaths
Pakistani male field hockey players
Olympic field hockey players of Pakistan
Olympic gold medalists for Pakistan
Olympic silver medalists for Pakistan
Olympic medalists in field hockey
Medalists at the 1956 Summer Olympics
Medalists at the 1960 Summer Olympics
Medalists at the 1964 Summer Olympics
Field hockey players at the 1952 Summer Olympics
Field hockey players at the 1956 Summer Olympics
Field hockey players at the 1960 Summer Olympics
Field hockey players at the 1964 Summer Olympics
Asian Games medalists in field hockey
Field hockey players at the 1958 Asian Games
Field hockey players at the 1962 Asian Games
Pakistani sports executives and administrators
Recipients of the Pride of Performance
People from Gujrat District
Asian Games gold medalists for Pakistan
Medalists at the 1962 Asian Games
Medalists at the 1958 Asian Games
Recipients of the Olympic Order